ROH2 was the contemporary arm of the Royal Opera House until 2012, commissioning and producing dance and contemporary opera works in the Linbury Studio Theatre, Clore Studio Upstairs, Paul Hamlyn Hall, and various other locations situated both within the Royal Opera House and outside. ROH2 also provided additional artistic resources to partners and associate artists in order to help the organisation realise its strategic aims.

Scope
ROH2 focused on developing art forms, creating opportunities for emerging artists, and attracting new and diverse audiences to the Royal Opera House. Since the start of the 2012/13 season, the work of ROH2 has been undertaken by the studio programs of the Royal Opera and the Royal Ballet.

ROH2 had a multi-layered approach, which included:

 New productions and commissions in the Linbury Studio Theatre and Clore Studio Upstairs
 Co-productions and co-commissions with partner organizations and companies
 A contemporary opera development program
 Associate artist programs and professional development work
 Festival programming in the public spaces of the Royal Opera House and outside the building
 visiting companies whose work complements the artistic program
 Taking ROH2 productions to partner regions and venues across the UK as part of the Royal Opera House on the Road programme

Working with partners 
ROH2 developed partnerships with a range of arts organizations and companies, including Music Theatre Wales, the Opera Group, the Britten Sinfonia, London Sinfonietta, Shobana Jeyasingh Dance, Ballet Black, the National Dance Network, Opera East, Dance Umbrella, the London Jazz Festival, and the London International Mime Festival.

Intended benefits include:

 Opening up ROH to a range of new audiences
 Access to ROH resources for partner companies
 Skills and knowledge sharing
 Innovative approaches to developing new work
 involvement of the ROH in a range of forums, opening up communication, and enabling new relationships.

New productions 
ROH2 regularly commissions and produces new opera and dance works. New productions initiated by ROH2 include:

Faeries (Will Tuckett), Pleasure's Progress (Will Tuckett/Paul Englishby), Goldberg (Kim Brandstrup/Tamara Rojo), Ghosts (Cathy Marston), The Soldier's Tale (Will Tuckett), Into the Woods (Will Tuckett), Dalston Songs (Helen Chadwick), The Thief of Baghdad (Will Tuckett/Paul Englishby), Into the Little Hill (John Fulljames/George Benjamin), The Red Balloon (Aletta Collins/Street Furniture), and Parthenogenesis (Katie Mitchell/James MacMillan)

Significant new work from visiting companies included Opera East with Heart of Darkness (Tarik O'Regan/Tom Phillips), Music Theatre Wales with In the Penal Colony (Philip Glass) and Letters of a Love Betrayed (Eleanor Alberga), English Touring Opera with Promised End (Alexander Goehr), Segue with Songs from a Hotel Bedroom (Kurt Weill/Kate Flatt/Peter Rowe), Open Heart Productions with God's Garden (Arthur Pita), The Opera Group with The Enchanted Pig (Jonathan Dove/Alasdair Middleton), Ballet Black with wide-ranging programmes of new dance commissions, Ros Warby as part of Dance Umbrella, Cleveland Watkiss and Nikki Yeoh as part of the London Jazz Festival and the Josef Nadj Company, and Jos Houben and Andre and Lefeuvre as part of the London International Mime Festival.

Work for families and young people 
ROH2 produced a substantial body of work for family audiences.The Royal Opera House's new work for young people and families produced by ROH2 includes Faeries, The Wind in the Willows, Pinocchio, Gentle Giant, Timecode, The Thief of Baghdad, and The Red Balloon.

Artist development initiatives 
ROH2 had a commitment to providing a space where artists could take creative risks and explore new ideas.

In 2008–09, ROH2 launched a two-year Choreographic Associates program. This was a structured program of professional and creative development opportunities for three emerging choreographers. Participants were offered a range of opportunities across ROH, including working with different departments and identifying areas of special interest for their practice. They also took part in Wayne McGregor's Arrows program alongside members of the Royal Ballet. The Choreographic Associate Program has been continued by the Royal Ballet Studio Program.

In 2005, with the support of the Genesis Foundation, ROH2 embarked on an intensive program to promote and encourage opera composition and launch new collaborations between composers and librettists. Over four years (2005–2009), OperaGenesis supported over 30 creative teams through workshops, mentoring, and informal showings. The projects ranged from work rooted in the classical tradition through electro-acoustic music, animated opera, choreographic collaborations, and even an opera that eventually became a musical.

The Opera Development Programme (2009–2011) at the Royal Opera House was designed to give composers and librettists at a variety of different levels the opportunity to produce new opera. Through courses for composers, librettists, and directors, as well as main stage rehearsal observerships, which allow small groups to watch the rehearsal process of stage and pianos to Sitzproben to stage and orchestras, the program aimed to help young people with less opera/vocal-writing experience develop their skills in writing for opera and the theatre.ROH2 also worked with more established composers, allowing them the time to create new works through week-long workshops.

Performances within the program also offered a number of diverse opportunities for composers:

 Exposure: Snapshots of New Opera provided opportunities for a variety of emerging composers to perform excerpts from new operas in an informal cabaret setting.
 OperaShots: evenings of short operas by composers outside the classical mainstream June 2010 saw works by Nitin Sawhney, Orlando Gough, and Jocelyn Pook; April 2011 saw works by Anne Dudley (dir. Terry Jones) and Stewart Copeland; and November 2011 saw a new work by Errolyn Wallen and Bonnie Greer.
 Chamber Opera Commission: ROH2 commissioned a new opera in the Linbury Studio Theatre, giving exposure to emerging composers of the moment.

Festivals/outside events 
Deloitte Ignite, sponsored by Deloitte, launches the ROH season. Each year, a guest curator is invited to use the art forms of the ROH as the starting point for a series of commissions, installations, exhibitions, and performances that challenge audiences to see opera, ballet, and contemporary art in new and different ways. The first Deloitte Ignite (2008) was curated by Wayne McGregor and took place over three days, attracting over 9000 people to the ROH. In 2009, Time Out magazine curated the festival, and the world's first Twitter opera was born. 2010's festival was curated by Joanna MacGregor with an arboreal theme and an eclectic range of music, dance, and film-based installations and live events. 2011 was curated by Mike Figgis and focused on the theme of "Just Tell the Truth." 2012 was an "African weekend," curated by Yinka Shonibare. 2013—the centenary year for Giuseppe Verdi and Richard Wagner—was curated by Stephen Fry and lasted for four weeks. 2014 focused on myth and was curated by Minna Moore Ede and the Royal Ballet.

ROH2 represented the Royal Opera House at festivals such as Latitude, a boutique festival in Southwold with 23,000 attendees.

References

External links 
 

The Royal Ballet
Royal Opera House
2012 disestablishments in England
Performing groups disestablished in 2012